The 2011 East Dorset District Council election took place on 5 May 2011 to elect members of East Dorset District Council in Dorset, England. The whole council was up for election and the Conservative Party stayed in overall control of the council.

Background
Before the election the Conservatives had a majority on the council with 25 seats, compared to 11 Liberal Democrats. Every seat was up for election, however 12 Conservative councillors, including the leader of the council Spencer Flower, faced no opposition at the election. The candidates at the election were 36 Conservatives, 18 Liberal Democrats, 10 UK Independence Party and 3 from Labour.

Election result
The Conservatives gained 5 seats from the Liberal Democrats to have 30 councillors, compared to 6 for the Liberal Democrats. Conservative gains including taking seats in West Moors and Corfe Mullen from the Liberal Democrats, with the margin in Corfe Mullen South ward being only 6 votes. Overall turnout at the election was 49.1%.

Ward results

By-elections between 2011 and 2015
A by-election was held in Colehill East ward on 17 July 2014 after the death of the Liberal Democrat councillor since 1973, Don Wallace. The seat was held for the Liberal Democrats by Barry Roberts with a majority of 416 votes over the Conservatives.

References

East Dorset District Council elections
2011 English local elections
2010s in Dorset